The Stories Are True is a debut full-length album by the American street punk band Time Again. It was released on April 25, 2006, via  Hellcat Records. Tim Armstrong is featured on the title track "The Stories Are True" and appeared on its music video.

Track listing

Personnel
 Daniel Dart - vocals
 Elijah Reyes - guitar
 Brian Burnham - bass
 Ryan Purucker - drums
 Tim Armstrong - vocals (track 4)
 John Morrical - mixing (track 4)
 Ben Meyer - mixing
 Gene Grimaldi - mastering
 Rachel Tejada - photography

Release history

References

External links 

2006 debut albums
Time Again albums
Hellcat Records albums